Freewood Acres is an unincorporated community located within Howell Township in Monmouth County, New Jersey, United States. The area is made up of mostly single-story homes arranged along a street grid in the northern reaches of the Pine Barrens. U.S. Route 9 runs through the center of the community just north of its interchange with Interstate 195. The Land O'Pines Elementary School and Manasquan Reservoir County Park exist to the east of the community.
It became the center of the Kalmyk American community in the latter part of the 20th century.

References

Neighborhoods in Howell Township, New Jersey
Unincorporated communities in Monmouth County, New Jersey
Unincorporated communities in New Jersey
Kalmyk diaspora